King's Guide may refer to:
 King's Guide, an undocumented name for Queen's Guide, the highest award for members of Girlguiding.
King's Guide to the Sands, sand pilot over Morecambe Bay, England